Senator Ulibarri may refer to:

David Ulibarri (fl. 2000s–2010s), New Mexico State Senate
Jessie Ulibarri (fl. 2010s), Colorado State Senate